Judson Laire (August 3, 1902 – July 5, 1979) was an American film, stage, and television actor best known for starring as Lars Hansen in the early CBS television series, Mama from 1949 to 1957, as well as several daytime soap operas including As the World Turns, The Nurses, Love is a Many Splendored Thing and The Edge Of Night.

Laire was born in Pleasantville, New York.

In a thirty-year stage career Laire appeared in ten Broadway productions.  A resident of Clinton Corners, New York, he died at Northern Dutchess Hospital in Rhinebeck, New York, in 1979 at 76.
Among his Broadway credits was Advise and Consent by Loring Mandel which opened in 1961.

Laire portrayed Woodrow Wilson in "Woodrow Wilson and the Unknown Soldier", an episode of Our American Heritage on NBC=TV on May 13, 1961.

Laire died in a hospital in Rhinebeck, New York, on July 5, 1979, aged 76.

Filmography

References

External links

1902 births
1979 deaths
American male television actors
Male actors from New York City
20th-century American male actors